Mirco Baldacci (born 19 September 1977) is a rally driver from San Marino, who scored two World Rally Championship points by finishing seventh on the 2006 Rally Australia.

Career
Baldacci made his World Rally Championship debut on Rallye Sanremo in 2000 behind the wheel of a Renault Clio Williams. In 2001 he contested five rounds of the Production World Rally Championship in a Mitsubishi Lancer Evo VI. In 2002 he contested the Junior World Rally Championship in a Citroën Saxo S1600, finishing fourth in class on Rallye Deutschland and 13th in the final standings.

Baldacci switched to a Fiat Punto for the 2003 JWRC, winning his class in Sanremo and ending the year fifth overall. For 2004 he switched to a Suzuki Ignis, again finishing fifth overall. He also entered four other WRC events in a Group N Mitsubishi, finishing as high as tenth overall on Rally Australia. He used a Punto again in the 2005 JWRC, winning on the Tour de Corse and finishing seventh in the final standings.

Baldacci returned to the PWRC for 2006, using a Mitsubishi Lancer Evo IX, finishing third in the final standings. He finished second in PWRC in Australia, seventh overall. Switching to a Subaru Impreza WRX STi for 2007, he ended the year sixth in PWRC. He returned to using an Evo IX in 2008, but four retirements from six rallies left him down in 11th overall.

WRC results

JWRC results

PWRC results

References

Living people
1977 births
Sammarinese rally drivers
World Rally Championship drivers